Samuel Stillman Pierce  (1807–1880) was a grocer in Boston, Massachusetts, who established the S.S. Pierce company in 1831.

Biography
Samuel Stillman Pierce was born in Cedar Grove, Dorchester, in 1807. In 1836, he married Ellen Maria Wallis. They had eight children. The family lived in the South End and Dorchester. He died in Boston 12 October 1880.

S.S. Pierce & Co.
In 1831, Pierce and his partner, Eldad Worcester, "started out by wholesaling provisions to the ships that crowded what was then a very busy Boston Harbor, but soon enough Pierce was bartering with ship captains, often exchanging his provisions for the delicacies they would bring to Boston from faraway ports.' Pierce said, "I may not make money, but I shall make a reputation."

The grocery business thrived, due in part to "celebrity customers ... John Quincy Adams, Daniel Webster," and Oliver Wendell Holmes, Sr. who said: "I was brought up on S.S. Pierce's groceries and I don't dare change."

The 1886 catalog for S.S. Pierce & Co., Importers and Grocers lists myriad items for sale in its Grocery, Wine, Cigar, and Perfumery Departments: gelatine; isinglass; chutneys; French vegetables in glass jars; Alghieri's soups; Wiesbaden goods; wines; Russian cigarettes; Egyptian cigarettes; quadruple essences; tooth brushes; soaps assorted; inexhaustible salts; and much more.

In 1887, the company moved from the corner of Tremont and Court Streets to Copley Square, into a new building designed by architect S. Edwin Tobey. Architecture critic Robert Campbell has observed of the building: "It's no masterpiece of architecture, but it's great urban design. A heap of dark Romanesque masonry, it anchored a corner of Copley Square as solidly as a mountain." The building was demolished in 1958.

In 1892, S.S. Pierce, under Wallace Pierce, the son of the founder, purchased the former Coolidge & Brother store, a two-story wooden building in Coolidge Corner, Brookline that had been on the site since 1857 and opened a branch at that location. Six years later, the company built a new Tudor-style building with a clock tower featuring an open deck. The tower was damaged in a storm in 1948 and replaced with a new tower, minus the open deck. The building still stands as a historically significant landmark today.

In addition to a wide variety of goods for sale, the company provided notable customer service. "The company hired horse-drawn sleighs to deliver groceries when snowstorms closed roads to auto traffic, and maintained a well-drilled corps of salesmen who would phone housewives at appointed hours. They not only suggested menus but answered such arcane questions as how to cook an ostrich egg (boil it) or how to extract the flavor from a 6-in. vanilla bean (bury a 1-in. cutting from the bean for a month in a pound of sugar). Once when a hostess in Poughkeepsie, N.Y., complained that a case of turtle soup had not arrived, a Pierce salesman took an overnight train to deliver it in person — just in time for her party."

In 1972, the S.S. Pierce company was sold to Seneca Foods Corp., of New York. which adopted the name S.S. Pierce until the 1980s.

Images

Further reading

References

External links

 Harvard Business School 1886 S.S.Pierce 
 Dorchester Book. Illustrated. Boston, 1899. 
 Copley 30-Aug-1888 
 Dartmouth Street  1954-1959 
 Copley Square 1954-1959 
 Envelope 7-1-1840 
 New York Historical Society. Tin Can from S.S. Pierce
 Anthony Sammarco, “S. S. Pierce: A Boston Tradition”, 24 September 2015. Boston Athenaeum Video

American grocers
Businesspeople from Boston
1807 births
1881 deaths
Companies established in 1831
Copley Square
Economic history of Boston
19th century in Boston
People from South End, Boston
19th-century American businesspeople